Atohwaim, or Kaugat, is a Papuan language of Papua, Indonesia.

References

External links 
 Timothy Usher, New Guinea World, Atohwaim

Languages of western New Guinea
Kayagar languages